Vidar Davidsen (born 4 January 1958 in Oslo) is a Norwegian football coach and former player. Davidsen played 46 international matches for Norway and scored 5 goals. One of those goals came in Norway's famous 2-1 win against Italy at Stadio Via del Mare in Lecce in September 1985. He currently works as a football commentator in TV3.

Career

Playing career
Davidsen started his playing career in Bærum, and had a short spell for Frigg before joining Vålerenga in 1980. Quickly becoming a first team regular, he helped win the Norwegian cup in his debut season. Davidsen and Vålerenga became league champions in 1981, 1983 og 1984.

Davidsen left Vålerenga after the 1986 season, and played one year in their rival club Lillestrøm before he decided to retire.

Coaching career
After he retired as a player, Bærum appointed him as a coach, and since then he has coached Strømmen, Frigg, Vålerenga, Lyn and Strømsgodset with a variable degree of success.

References

External links

Norwegian footballers
Norway international footballers
Bærum SK players
Frigg Oslo FK players
Lillestrøm SK players
Vålerenga Fotball players
Lyn Fotball managers
Strømsgodset Toppfotball managers
Vålerenga Fotball managers
1958 births
Living people

Association football midfielders
Strømmen IF managers
Norwegian football managers
Footballers from Oslo